Łysaków-Kolonia  is a village in the administrative district of Gmina Zaklików, within Stalowa Wola County, Podkarpackie Voivodeship, in south-eastern Poland.

References

Villages in Stalowa Wola County